UFC Fight Night: Smith vs. Teixeira (also known as  UFC Fight Night 171 and  UFC on ESPN+ 29) was a mixed martial arts event produced by the Ultimate Fighting Championship that took place on May 13, 2020 at VyStar Veterans Memorial Arena in Jacksonville, Florida, United States.

Background
Due to the COVID-19 pandemic, the UFC had to cancel two events and postpone four events between March 21 and May 2. On April 24, they announced their return of UFC 249 in Jacksonville, Florida, with two other events scheduled for the same venue on May 13 and May 16 respectively.

A light heavyweight bout between former UFC Light Heavyweight Championship challengers Anthony Smith and Glover Teixeira served as the event headliner. They were originally scheduled to headline another event on April 25, but it was cancelled due to the ongoing pandemic.

The event included fighters that were pulled from other events previously cancelled, as well as the following bouts:

A middleweight bout between Karl Roberson and Marvin Vettori (also scheduled for the cancelled event on April 25 in Lincoln, Nebraska).
A heavyweight bout between former UFC Heavyweight Champion Andrei Arlovski and Philipe Lins (scheduled for UFC Fight Night: Hermansson vs. Weidman).
A women's bantamweight bout between Sijara Eubanks and Sarah Moras (scheduled for the original UFC 249 on April 18 in Brooklyn, New York).

At the weigh-ins, Roberson weighed in at 187.5 pounds, one and a half pounds over the middleweight non-title fight limit. He was fined 20% of his purse, which went to his opponent Vettori and the bout was expected to proceed at a catchweight. However, the bout was cancelled on the day of the event due to medical issues caused by Roberson's attempt to cut weight.

Results

Bonus awards
The following fighters received $50,000 bonuses.
Fight of the Night: Brian Kelleher vs. Hunter Azure
Performance of the Night: Glover Teixeira and Drew Dober

Reported payout
The following is the reported payout to the fighters as reported to the Florida State Boxing Commission. It does not include sponsor money and also does not include the UFC's traditional "fight night" bonuses. The total disclosed payout for the event was $1,175,000.
 Glover Teixeira: $230,000 def. Anthony Smith: $130,000
 Ben Rothwell: $260,000 def. Ovince Saint Preux: $95,000
 Drew Dober: $166,000 def. Alexander Hernandez: $36,000
 Ricky Simón: $60,000 def. Ray Borg: $46,000
 Andrei Arlovski: $325,000 def. Philipe Lins: $80,000
 Thiago Moisés: $24,000 def. Michael Johnson: $83,000
 Sijara Eubanks: $66,000 def. Sarah Moras: $23,000
 Omar Morales: $24,000 def. Gabriel Benítez: $40,000
 Brian Kelleher: $60,000 def. Hunter Azure: $12,000
 Chase Sherman: $28,000 def. Ike Villanueva: $12,000

Aftermath
On October 20, it was announced that the United States Anti-Doping Agency (USADA) issued a nine-month suspension for Chase Sherman, after he tested positive for anastrozole as the result of an in-competition sample.

See also 

 List of UFC events
 List of current UFC fighters
 2020 in UFC

References 
 

UFC Fight Night
2020 in mixed martial arts
2020 in sports in Florida
Events in Jacksonville, Florida
Mixed martial arts in Florida
Sports competitions in Jacksonville, Florida
May 2020 sports events in the United States
Impact of the COVID-19 pandemic on sports